Kamill Balatoni (1912 – 7 February 1945) was a Hungarian sprint canoeist who competed in the late 1930s. He won a silver medal in the K-1 10000 m folding event at the 1938 ICF Canoe Sprint World Championships in Vaxholm. During the Second World War, he served in the Hungarian Resistance, but was captured by the SS and shot along with two others.

References

Hungarian male canoeists
1912 births
1945 deaths
ICF Canoe Sprint World Championships medalists in kayak
People executed by Nazi Germany by firing squad
Resistance members killed by Nazi Germany
Hungarian resistance members
20th-century Hungarian people